

Portugal
 Angola –
 António de Almeida, Governor of Angola (1749–53)
 António Álvares da Cunha, Governor of Angola (1753–58)
 Macau – D. Rodrigo de Castro, Governor of Macau (1752–55)

Colonial governors
Colonial governors
1753